VPNBook is a VPN service offering servers in multiple countries.

Description 
The service connects to a VPN via OpenVPN client or a PPTP connection. There are minimal variety of geographic locations. Available servers include the United States, Canada and Romania. VPNBook can be used to bypass some governmental restrictions. The service can be connected to by two ways, by connection via a third-party OpenVPN client or through PPTP. The Mac OS X, iOS, Android, Ubuntu, and Windows operating systems all have PPTP support built in.

The software (OpenVPN clients) can be used also, that provides the protocol stack, file system, and process scheduling. OpenVPN uses SSL protocol which is generally more secure than Layer 2 Tunnel Protocol's PPTP.

Reception 
In a review done by PC Magazine, it was concluded that the service is a good choice among free VPN services, even though it has certain functionality flaws. TechRadar reviewed VPNBook negatively, criticizing its poor performance and lack of desktop and mobile apps.

See also 
 Comparison of virtual private network services

References

External links 

Free security software
Computer network security
Virtual private network services